Catch 22 is the eighth studio album by Swedish melodic death metal band Hypocrisy. It was released on 19 March 2002 by Nuclear Blast.

Track listing

2008 re-release 
On 9 May 2008, the album was re-released as Catch 22 V2.0.08. Peter Tägtgren re-recorded the vocals and guitar parts and remixed and remastered the album. He said on the official site, "We still think it is a great fucking album but it got slammed and misunderstood because of the vocal style and the drumsound and so on."

Personnel 
Peter Tägtgren – vocals, guitar, keyboards
Lars Szöke – drums
Michael Hedlund – bass

Charts

References 

Hypocrisy (band) albums
Nuclear Blast albums
2002 albums
Albums produced by Peter Tägtgren